Enrico Rocca (b. Turin, 21 April 1847 – Genova, 9 June 1915) was an Italian violin maker of the 19th and the 20th Centuries and son of Giuseppe Rocca.

Although he worked differently from his father Giuseppe Rocca, Enrico's  work takes more inspiration from Eugenio Praga.

Biography 
Enrico Rocca was son of Giuseppe, who is considered probably the most important maker of the 19th century; Enrico  had a very hard life and he wasn't trained all the way by his father.
The loss of his father at the age of 19 forced him to run away from his family.  He ended up working  as a boatman, a sailor, a ship carpenter (for many years) and a woodworker. He opened his workshop in 1878.

After twenty years passed on the docks of the port of Genova, he began violin making building mainly six strings lombard mandolins and guitars; he started making violins only after 1890.
By the turn of the century and after Praga's death (1901), Enrico Rocca became the pre-eminent violin maker in Genoa.
His work is always dominated by a great spontaneity and reveals a strong personality. He was consistent in his production as well as style till his death.

His preferred models were Guarneri, Stradivari and Amati.
Enrico Rocca's instruments are much appreciated today.

Quotes

"There’s no evidence of pupils, but it seems highly likely that Eugenio Praga had occasionally relied on the collaboration of Enrico Rocca, since there are many similarities in their technique and in the models used. " - Alberto Giordano

References

 
 ::: Alberto Giordano&C. - Fine violins, violas and cellos in Genoa ::: at www.giordanoviolins.com
 La Liuteria Italiana / Italian Violin Making in the 1800s and 1900s - Umberto Azzolina
 I Maestri Del Novicento - Carlo Vettori
 La Liuteria Lombarda del '900 - Roberto Codazzi, Cinzia Manfredini  2002
 Dictionary of 20th Century Italian Violin Makers - Marlin Brinser 1978
 
 
 Walter Hamma, Meister Italienischer Geigenbaukunst, Wilhelmshaven 1993,

External links
 ::: Alberto Giordano&C. - Fine violins, violas and cellos in Genoa ::: at www.giordanoviolins.com

1847 births
1915 deaths
Italian luthiers
Businesspeople from Genoa
19th-century Italian musicians